Distant Plastic Trees is the debut studio album by American indie pop band The Magnetic Fields, released in 1991. Lead vocals on the album are performed by Susan Anway.

The album is noteworthy for its stripped down sound and largely synthesized instrumentation. Stephin Merritt himself described the album as a "small record, intentionally small" and heavily inspired by Young Marble Giants.

The song "Babies Falling" is a cover of a song by The Wild Stares.

Release 
Distant Plastic Trees was originally released in Japan and the United Kingdom on the RCA Victor and Red Flame labels, respectively. The album was released in the United States on the band's own imprint, PoPuP.

Merge Records reissued the album in 1994 as a double album compilation with the band's second album, The Wayward Bus. The song "Plant White Roses" was omitted from the Merge reissue.

Reception
The New Rolling Stone Album Guide wrote that the first two albums "showcase sexually ambiguous lyrics, loopy arrangements, and the disaffected voice of Susan Anway ... But they also suffer from an air of inconsequentiality." Trouser Press wrote that "the baroque pop structures of songs like 'Smoke Signals' are redolent of the classics Merritt clearly holds dear, but his impressionistic wordplay — which often alights on bracing, upsetting images — seldom settles into simple cliché."

Track listing

Personnel
Stephin Merritt – songwriting, instrumentation and production

Additional personnel
Susan Anway – lead vocals
Ken Michaels – engineering
Wendy Smith – album cover
Art Daly – insert photo

References

The Magnetic Fields albums
1991 debut albums
RCA Victor albums